Rick D. West (born 1963) is a retired United States Navy sailor who served as the 12th Master Chief Petty Officer of the Navy.

Early life and education
West was born in 1963 in Rising Fawn, Georgia, and graduated from Northwest Georgia High School in Trenton, Georgia in 1981.

Naval career

After graduating from high school, West enlisted in the United States Navy. He received recruit training and Quartermaster training at Orlando, Florida, followed by Enlisted Submarine School at Naval Submarine Base New London in Groton, Connecticut. His first duty assignment was on board , where he completed Submarine Qualifications.

Leadership assignments
West was then assigned as Chief of the Boat on board the San Diego-based Fast Attack Submarine , completing two Western Pacific deployments. The crew earned two Battle Efficiency "E" awards. He then served as command master chief at Commander, Submarine Squadron Eleven. Upon completion of his tour, he was selected as force master chief and attended the Senior Enlisted Academy in Newport, Rhode Island.

West served as force master chief, Submarine Force, United States Pacific Fleet (COMSUBPAC) from January 2001 to January 2004.

West was then assigned to  homeported in San Diego, where he completed a deployment to the Persian Gulf and qualified as Enlisted Surface Warfare Specialist. He was selected during his tour on the USS Preble to serve as United States Pacific Fleet, fleet master chief, from February 2005 to June 2007. Since 2007, West had served as the 14th fleet master chief for Commander, United States Fleet Forces Command, prior to his selection as Master Chief Petty Officer of the Navy (MCPON) beginning December 12, 2008.

On December 12, 2008, West accepted the passing of the ceremonial cutlass from outgoing MCPON Joe R. Campa. On September 28, 2012, he stepped down as MCPON and retired from the navy after a three-decade career.

Awards and decorations

References

External links

1963 births
Living people
Master Chief Petty Officers of the United States Navy
People from Dade County, Georgia
Recipients of the Legion of Merit
Recipients of the Navy Distinguished Service Medal
Recipients of the Meritorious Service Medal (United States)